The Fakhfakh Cabinet was the 30th government of the Tunisian Republic. It was formed by Elyes Fakhfakh on the appointment of President Kais Saied.

History

Background and formation 
The  October 2019 general election resulted in a highly fractured parliament, with no party or list receiving more than 20 percent of the vote. No party or alliance obtained enough seats for a majority. Despite losing seats, Ennahdha became the largest party due to the fracturing of votes between other smaller, newer, or less established parties. According to article 89 of the Tunisian Constitution the President of the Republic shall within one week of the declaration of the definitive election results ask the candidate of the party or the electoral coalition which won the largest number of seats in the parliament to form a government, within a one month period, extendable once. On 15 november 2019 leader of Ennahda Rached Ghannouchi presented Habib Jemli for the post of prime minister when he met Kais Saied at the presidential palace  Jemli has been given one month, with the potential to renew for another month, to form a coalition government. Although Jemli was independent it was know he was very close to Ennahdha. He presented his list of ministers on 2 January 2020. On 10 January 2020, he failed to gain the confidence of the Tunisian parliament.

Cabinet members

References 

Cabinets of Tunisia
Cabinets established in 2020
Cabinets disestablished in 2020
2020 establishments in Tunisia
2020 disestablishments in Tunisia